Beyond the Horizon is a debut novel by Ghanaian author Amma Darko. The English version was first released on 1 March 1995.

References 

1995 debut novels
1995 novels